Lee Tae-yang may refer to:

Lee Tae-yang (baseball, born 1990)
Lee Tae-yang (baseball, born 1993)